Gopalapuram is a village in the Orathanadu taluk of Thanjavur district, Tamil Nadu, India. As of the 2001 census, Gopalapuram had a total population of 100 with 49 males and 51 females. The sex ratio was 1041. The literacy rate was 74.49.

References 
 

Villages in Thanjavur district